Bon-e Kuh (also Romanized as Bon-e Kūh, Bonkūh, and Bun-i-Kūh; also known as Boneh Kūh) is a village in Lajran Rural District, in the Central District of Garmsar County, Semnan Province, Iran. At the 2006 census, its population was 20, in 7 families.

References 

Populated places in Garmsar County